MGP may refer to:

Music

Melodi Grand Prix 
Melodi Grand Prix, the Norwegian Eurovision Song Contest selection
Melodi Grand Prix Junior, Norwegian Junior song contest that earlier selected the entry to representing Norway in the MGP Nordic, and before that JESC
Dansk Melodi Grand Prix, the Danish Eurovision Song Contest selection
MGP Junior (Danish TV series), Danish Junior song contest that earlier selected the entry to representing Denmark in the MGP Nordic, and before that JESC
MGP Nordic, the former Nordic version of Junior Eurovision Song Contest (JESC)

Others 
Music Genome Project

Sports
Malaysian Grand Prix, a Grand Prix for the Formula One automobile racing series held at the Sepang International Circuit]
Manx Grand Prix, motorcycle races are held on the Isle of Man 
Morten Gamst Pedersen (born 1981), Norwegian football player for Blackburn Rovers F.C.
Multnomah Greyhound Park, a former dog-racing track in Wood Village, Oregon, in greater Portland

Others
MGP Ingredients, or its subsidiary MGP of Indiana, a company that operates a distillery in Lawrenceburg, Indiana
MGP submachine gun, a family of 9 mm submachine guns and semi-automatic pistols produced by the Peruvian Navy
MagicPoint, a software program for meeting presentations
Maharashtrawadi Gomantak Party, a political party in Goa, India
Manufactured Gas Plant, a facility for production of coal gas
Marie Gluesenkamp Perez, member of the U.S. House of Representatives (as of January 3, 2023)
Marina de Guerra del Perú, the Spanish name of the Peruvian Navy
Mark Goodson Productions, production company owned by Mark Goodson
Mathematics Genealogy Project, a web-based database for an "academic genealogy" of mathematicians
Matrix gla protein, a type of protein found in a number of body tissues in mammals, birds, and fish
Merdeka Generation Package, a Singapore government package
Mouse Genetics Project, a mutant mouse production and phenotyping programme

See also
Melodi Grand Prix (disambiguation)